George Maguire (born 17 January 1985) is an English actor and musician, known for originating the role of Dave Davies in the musical Sunny Afternoon.

Career 
Maquire made his first appearance on stage, aged 9, in a small role in a pantomime production of Robin Hood and the Babes in the Wood at Guildford Civic Hall. When he was 10, he attended an open audition that landed him his West End debut in Oliver! at the Palladium.

While still appearing in Oliver! he began to attend Italia Conti Academy of Theatre Arts. During his time there he saw the first London production of Rent which proved a great inspiration for him. "It was raw, rocky and real and I remember thinking 'that's the kind of stuff I want to do'." In 2011, Maguire appeared as Richard Loeb in Thrill Me, first at the Tristan Bates Theatre in London and then at the Charing Cross Theatre. This was followed by his first of two stints as 1970s glam rock star Marc Bolan in 20th Century Boy which premiered at the New Wolsey Theatre in Ipswich in September 2011.

A planned tour of Hair with Maguire taking the lead role of Berger was cancelled with the exception of a two-week engagement at Deutsches Theater in Munich. A few months later, in July 2012, there was a one-off charity performance of this production at the Piccadilly Theatre in London in aid of Help for Heroes which featured Oliver Tobias, who portrayed Berger at the first London production of Hair in 1968. In September of the same year, George returned to 20th Century Boy, this time performing at Belgrade Theatre in Coventry. Early 2013 saw Maguire appear in a production called Lift, where he played a Busker, looking for cash and for the woman that always walks past him smiling every morning. Maguire said about the production: "I have always been passionate about new writing and love the chance to originate a role." Maguire then played Dave Davies in the Kinks musical, Sunny Afternoon, on which he commented: "It's quite rare and special to be able to see a piece through from the beginning." The show opened at the Hampstead Theatre in April 2014 and after a sold-out run of 6 weeks, transferred to the West End's Harold Pinter Theatre where it ran for two years. Maguire left the show in early October 2015. In April 2015, George Maguire won the Laurence Olivier Award for Best Supporting Actor in Sunny Afternoon, the musical simultaneously picking up three further awards, including Best New Musical.

In 2017, Maguire appeared as a guest character in the BBC One soap opera EastEnders as Felix Moore. Then in April 2020, he appeared in an episode of the BBC daytime soap opera Doctors as Greg Taylor-Smith.

More recently, as well as continuing his acting Career, he has been teaching at Stageworks College in St Neots.

Stage

Filmography

References

External links

1985 births
Living people
English male musical theatre actors
English male stage actors
English male singer-songwriters
English rock singers
English rock guitarists
Laurence Olivier Award winners
Alumni of the Italia Conti Academy of Theatre Arts
English male guitarists